Islip Union Free School District, also known as Islip Public Schools, is a school district in Long Island, New York. Its headquarters are in the Administration Building in the hamlet of Islip in the Town of Islip.

The school district's mascot is the Buccaneer.

The school district includes some territory within the adjacent areas of Bay Shore and Central Islip.

In 1986 voters rejected a proposal to spend $247,321 ($ in today's terms) to fund after school activities and sports programs on a 704 to 586 basis.

Graduates of Woodhull School (PK-6) of the Fire Island School District can attend Islip secondary schools.

Schools
 Islip High School
 Islip Middle School
Elementary schools:
 Commack Road Elementary School
 Maud S. Sherwood Elementary School
 Wing Elementary School

References

Further reading
 Gray, Katti. "Islip School Budget Going Before Voters." Newsday. September 26, 1989. News p. 31.

External links

Islip Public Schools

School districts in New York (state)
Islip (town), New York
Education in Suffolk County, New York